Þór/KA is an Icelandic women's football team based in Akureyri. It is a joint team fielded by Þór Akureyri and Knattspyrnufélag Akureyrar and currently competes in Úrvalsdeild kvenna. On September 29, 2017, they won their second Icelandic championship.

History
Since 1999, Þór Akureyri and KA have fielded a joint women's team under the name Þór/KA in the Iceland's top tier Úrvalsdeild kvenna. Knattspyrnufélag Siglufjarðar joined the collaboration in 2001 and subsequently the team was named Þór/KA/KS until KS left the collaboration after 2005 season. In 2006 the team finished 7th of 8 teams, 8th/9 in 2007, the reaching a good 4th/10 in 2008 and then bettering those results with 3rd/10 in 2009 and a second-place finish in 2010. As Iceland was in the top 8 leagues of UEFA, those second place was enough to qualify for the 2011–12 UEFA Women's Champions League. The team entered in the round of 32 but lost 14–2 on aggregate to German team Turbine Potsdam.

In 2010 the team also went to the semi-finals in the Icelandic cup, losing to the eventual winner Valur. In 2013 they lost the cup final.

In 2012 Þór/KA finished first in the Úrvalsdeild and secured its first ever Icelandic championship.

Prior to the 2017 season, KA declared that it was going to end the collaboration and field its own women's team. The decision was highly criticised, including by Þór's chairman, team captain Karen Nóadóttir and star player Sandra María Jessen. In March, KA reversed its decision and struck a deal with Þór to continue the collaboration until at least to the end of the 2019 season.

On September 29, 2017, the club secured its second national championship by defeating FH, in the last game of the season, 2–0 with goals from Sandra Jessen and Sandra Stephany Mayor.

On April 24, Þór/KA won the 2018 League Cup. On April 29, they won the Icelandic Super Cup, defeating ÍBV women's football 3–0 with goals from Sandra Stephany Mayor and Margrét Árnadóttir.

On 23 November 2018, the teams announced that they agreed to continue the collaboration until at least to the end of the 2023 season.

Trophies and achievements
 Úrvalsdeild kvenna (Premier League):
 2012, 2017
 Icelandic Women's Football Cup:
 Runner-up: 19891, 2013
 Super Cup :
 2013, 2018
 League Cup :
 2009, 2018
B-division: 2004, 2006, 2007, 2008
 Icelandic Division I :
 19831, 19922, 1994 (as ÍBA), 1999, 2005

  As Þór Akureyri
  As KA

References

Football clubs in Iceland
Association football clubs established in 1999
1999 establishments in Iceland
Sport in Akureyri
Þór Akureyri
Knattspyrnufélag Akureyrar